Miroslav Pastva (born 15 April 1992) is a Slovak football midfielder who currently plays for Swiss club FC Ibach.

Club career

FC ViOn Zlaté Moravce - Vráble
Pastva made his professional Fortuna Liga debut for FC ViOn Zlaté Moravce - Vráble against Spartak Myjava on 16 July 2016.

References

External links
 MFK Tatran Liptovský Mikuláš official club profile
 
 Eurofotbal profile
 Futbalnet profile
 Miroslav Pastva at 90minut

1992 births
Living people
Slovak footballers
Slovak expatriate footballers
Association football midfielders
MFK Tatran Liptovský Mikuláš players
FC ViOn Zlaté Moravce players
MKP Pogoń Siedlce players
Slovak Super Liga players
2. Liga (Slovakia) players
I liga players
Sportspeople from Liptovský Mikuláš
Slovak expatriate sportspeople in Poland
Slovak expatriate sportspeople in Switzerland
Expatriate footballers in Poland
Expatriate footballers in Switzerland